The 2016–17 Austrian Football First League  (German: Erste Liga, also known as Sky Go Erste Liga due to sponsorship) was the 43rd season of the Austrian second-level football league. It began on 22 July 2016 and ended on 26 May 2017. The fixtures were announced on 17 June 2016.

Teams
Ten teams participate in the 2016-17 season. WSG Wattens, FC Blau-Weiß Linz and SV Horn were directly promoted after winning the 2015–16 Austrian Regional Leagues. SV Grödig were relegated from the 2015–16 Bundesliga; however, they withdrew to the Austrian Regional League.

Personnel and kits

League table

Results
Teams played each other four times in the league. In the first half of the season each team played every other team twice (home and away), and then did the same in the second half of the season.

First half of season

Second half of season

Season statistics

Top goalscorers
.

Top assists
.

Attendances

See also
 2016–17 Austrian Football Bundesliga
 2016–17 Austrian Cup

References

External links
 Austrian Football First League at Bundesliga.at 

2. Liga (Austria) seasons
2016–17 in Austrian football
Aus